The Trenton Bengals was the name given to two separate teams in the American Basketball League, the first professional basketball league in the United States.

Trenton Bengals/Royal Bengals
The Trenton Bengals (also known as the Royal Bengals) were an American basketball team based in Trenton, New Jersey that was a member of the American Basketball League.

Year-by-year

Trenton Bengals
The Trenton Bengals were an American basketball team based in the Bronx, New York that was a member of the American Basketball League.

The team was previously known as the Paterson Panthers. For the 2nd half of the season, the team became the Passaic Red Devils on January 2, 1936.

Year-by-year

Defunct basketball teams in the United States
Basketball teams in New Jersey
Sports in Trenton, New Jersey